PP-218 Multan-VIII is a Constituency of Provincial Assembly of Punjab.

General elections 2013
Won by Malik Mazhar Abbas ran of PMLN.

General elections 2008

See also
 PP-217 Multan-VII
 PP-219 Multan-IX

References

External links
 Election commission Pakistan's official website
 Awazoday.com check result
 Official Website of Government of Punjab

Provincial constituencies of Punjab, Pakistan